The 2001 New York Jets season was the franchise's 32nd season in the National Football League (NFL), the 42nd season overall, and the first under new head coach Herman Edwards. The team improved upon its 9–7 record from 2000 and the Jets finished 10–6 and qualified for the final Wild Card position in the American Football Conference (AFC). They lost in the Wild Card round to the Oakland Raiders, with the score of 38–24.

NFL draft

Staff

Roster

Schedule

Regular season
In the wake of the September 11 attacks, the Jets’ players made a unanimous vote not to play against the Oakland Raiders in Week 2. This game was made up on January 6, 2002.

Note: Intra-division opponents are in bold text.

Postseason

Standings

References

External links
 2001 team stats

New York Jets seasons
New York Jets
New York Jets season
21st century in East Rutherford, New Jersey
Meadowlands Sports Complex